André Badonnel (5 July 1898 Épinal, Vosges -30 April 1991) was a French entomologist who specialised in Psocoptera. 
He wrote Faune de France. Psocoptères. Paris. Paul Lechevalier 1943.
His collection is in the Natural History Museum of Geneva.

Sources
 Lhoste, J., 1987 Les Entomologistes francais 1750 - 1950. INRA, OPIE (Entomology): 115 [A1036].

French entomologists
1898 births
1991 deaths
20th-century French zoologists